Ali Sorud (also Romanized as ‘Alī Sorūd) is a village in Layl Rural District, in the Central District of Lahijan County, Gilan Province, Iran. At the 2006 census, its population was 332, in 113 families.

References 

Populated places in Lahijan County